Björn Ove Christer Mattiasson (born 29 July 1971) is a Swedish football manager and former player. He most notably played for IF Elfsborg, AIK, and Djurgårdens IF and made two appearances for the Sweden national team. He was the Allsvenskan top scorer of 1997.

Club career 
Starting off his career with Byttorps IF, Mattiasson made his Allsvenskan debut with IF Elfsborg and was the 1997 Allsvenskan top scorer with the team. He later signed with AIK ahead of the 1999 Allsvenskan season where he helped AIK win the 1998–99 Svenska Cupen and played in the 1999–2000 UEFA Champions League. He helped Djurgårdens IF win the 2002 Allsvenskan after a short stint with Lilleström in Norway and finished up his career with IF Brommapojkarna, Vallentuna BK, and Valsta Syrianska IK.

International career 
Mattiasson made his full international debut for the Sweden national team on 24 January 1998 in a 1–0 friendly loss to the United States when he replaced Mattias Jonson in the 86th minute. He made his second and last international appearance on 29 January 1998 in a friendly 0–0 draw with Jamaica, starting as a forward alongside Mats Lilienberg.

Honours
AIK
 Svenska Cupen: 1998–99

Djurgårdens IF
 Allsvenskan: 2002, 2003

Individual
 Allsvenskan top scorer: 1997

References

Living people
1971 births
Association football forwards
Swedish footballers
Sweden international footballers
Swedish football managers
Allsvenskan players
Eliteserien players
Norrby IF players
IF Elfsborg players
AIK Fotboll players
Lillestrøm SK players
Djurgårdens IF Fotboll players
IF Brommapojkarna players
Swedish expatriate footballers
Expatriate footballers in Norway
People from Borås
Sportspeople from Västra Götaland County